Kim Coco Iwamoto (born May 26, 1968) is an American politician from Hawaii. She was one of the Democratic primary candidates for the position of Lieutenant Governor of Hawaii in the 2018 election. She previously served as a commissioner on the Hawaii Civil Rights Commission and was elected to serve two terms on the Hawaii Board of Education. 

Iwamoto was recognized as a Champion of Change by President Barack Obama in 2013, and in 2018 Newsweek listed her as one of fifty need-to-know pioneers for LGBTQ rights.

Early life and career 
Iwamoto was born on the island of Kauai, and is of Japanese descent. Her mother went into labor at a private party hosted by Grace Guslander to celebrate the expansion of her Coco Palms Resort, and Iwamoto was then born the next day.  Guslander visited Iwamoto's mother in hospital with a bouquet of flowers, a card, and a request to name Iwamoto “Coco” after her hotel.

Education 
Iwamoto attended Kaimukī Community Christian Pre-School on Oʻahu, Hōkūlani Elementary School, Aliʻiōlani Elementary School, and Hanahauʻoli School. She later attended and graduated from Saint Louis School. She went on to qualify as an Associate of Arts in Merchandising at the Fashion Institute of Technology, and subsequently received a Bachelor of Arts in Creative Writing from San Francisco State University and a Juris Doctor from the University of New Mexico School of Law.

In 2011, Iwamoto completed Harvard University's John F. Kennedy School of Government program for Senior Executives in State and Local Government as a David Bohnett Foundation LGBTQ Victory Institute Leadership Fellow.

Family and personal life 
Iwamoto's  paternal great-grandparents left Japan to work in the sugar cane plantations of Kauaʻi.  Her paternal grandmother met her paternal grandfather at Tip-Top Restaurant on Kauai, where she was working as a cashier.  The two used their family cars to start a taxi company, which eventually expanded into a tour company and a rental-car company.  Iwamoto's father began working for the family business in high school as a car washer, and their collective efforts became known as Roberts Hawaii.

Iwamoto's maternal grandparents left Japan to grow cantaloupe and other produce in Imperial Valley, California.  During World War II, Iwamoto's mother and her family were forced into internment camps in Poston, Arizona.  Iwamoto's uncles were released from the internment camp to enlist in the military to serve the United States of America.  Eventually the entire family was released and they returned to their farm.  When Iwamoto's mother was in high school, she contributed to the family business by taking care of all the bookkeeping.

Volunteering and leadership 
Shortly after finishing her undergraduate degree, Iwamoto moved back to New York City where she had attended the Fashion Institute of Technology. Using her own life experience as a transgender woman, she spent time volunteering at a local community center, helping youth develop leadership skills.  It was here that her passions for helping houseless youth and LGBTQ houseless youth were fostered.  Helping youth like the ones she worked with in New York was part of her motivation for attending law school. When she returned to Hawaii she became a licensed therapeutic foster parent.

Public service and business experience 
Iwamoto recently served as a commissioner on the Hawaii Civil Rights Commission, appointed by Governor Neil Abercrombie to serve the four-year term from 2012 to 2016. She also previously served two terms with the Hawaii Board of Education, Oahu-at-Large from 2006 to 2011. Her election as a trans woman in November 2006 made her, at that time, the highest ranking openly transgender elected official in the United States and the first openly transgender official to win statewide office. She was reelected in 2010 with 25% more votes than in 2006.

Iwamoto's other work experiences include serving as Managing Attorney at Volunteer Legal Services Hawaii and facilitating affordable housing through AQuA Rentals, LLC (Affordable Quality Apartment Rentals, LLC).  Her volunteer work includes serving on the Board of Directors for both Kūlia Nā Mamo and Hawaiʻi People’s Fund.

2018 Lieutenant Governor primary election 

Iwamoto announced her bid for Lieutenant Governor in November 2017. She was endorsed by the Sierra Club of Hawaii, Victory Fund, Maui Time Weekly, Our Revolution Oʻahu Chapter, Unite Here! Local 5, politician Gary Hooser, activist Mari Matsuda, and advocate and teacher Maya Soetoro-Ng, among others. Although she received more than 34,000 votes in the Democratic primary, she lost the party nomination to Senator Josh Green.

Electoral history

2022

2020

Notable national advocacy and recognition 
Iwamoto was recognized as a Champion of Change by President Barack Obama.

Iwamoto publicly opposed passage of California's Proposition 8, outlawing same-sex marriages in California. She has stated that Proposition 8 reminds her of her mother's internment during World War II and believes the proposition is a violation of essential civil rights, stating, "The country has acknowledged that [internment] as a mistake, to just go with populous fear to oppress a specific group. I think we're going to look back at this kind of oppression as a mistake." 

In 2021, Iwamoto joined with local advocates known as the Wai Ola alliance as a plaintiff in a suit against the United States Navy to stop its plan to double line its underground fuel tanks at Red Hill.

References

External links
 Hawaii Civil Rights Commission - Meet the Commissioners
 BOE Member Profile - Kim Coco Iwamoto 
 Kim Coco Iwamoto - BOE Candidate

1968 births
American women of Japanese descent in politics
Fashion Institute of Technology alumni
Hawaii politicians of Japanese descent
American LGBT people of Asian descent
LGBT appointed officials in the United States
LGBT people from Hawaii
Living people
Members of the Hawaii Board of Education
People from Kauai County, Hawaii
San Francisco State University alumni
Transgender politicians
Transgender women
University of New Mexico School of Law alumni
Women in Hawaii politics